The Advisory Committee on Business Appointments (ACOBA) is a non-departmental public body in the United Kingdom, which was set up in 1975 to provide advice on applications from the most senior Crown servants who wish to take up outside appointments after they leave Crown service.  Since 1995 it has also provided advice to former Ministers on their employment in the two years after leaving office. The committee is chaired by Baroness Browning.

It was branded "toothless" in April 2017 by the Public Administration and Constitutional Affairs Select Committee. The Committee's own Secretariat stated in a 2018 Freedom of Information (FOI) request that "ACOBA, which has no enforcement power and therefore depends upon voluntary cooperation from applicants..."

References

External links 
Advisory Committee on Business Appointments

Cabinet Office (United Kingdom)
Non-departmental public bodies of the United Kingdom government